The Pipistrel Alpha Trainer is a Slovenian two-seat, single-engine light-sport aircraft intended specifically for flight training, designed and produced by Pipistrel in Gorizia, Italy.

The Alpha was announced at the end of 2011 and production started in 2012. Based on the design of the Pipistrel Virus, it is intended to be a low-cost solution for LSA flight training both in the acquisition and operating costs, while still including a full airframe emergency recovery parachute system as standard equipment.

The electric version of the Alpha Trainer was announced in 2015, and as of January 2020, it remained the only commercially available electric airplane in the world, with the exception of electric motorgliders.

Design and development

The aircraft features a cantilever high-wing, a two-seats in side-by-side configuration, tricycle landing gear and a single  Rotax 912 UL engine in tractor configuration. It was designed to comply with the US light-sport aircraft rules.

The aerodynamic design is based on the Pipistrel Virus but structurally redesigned to simplify the manufacture and maintenance. The aircraft is made from single-skin laminate composite, instead of the honeycomb layup found in the Virus. The landing gear was reinforced for training use, and the main wheels' differential brakes replaced with a central brake lever between the seats. The cockpit is equipped with traditional and cheaper round-dial style flight instruments and a GPS, rather than a full glass cockpit. Air brakes are optional to offer simpler controls and the flaperons redesigned to have 25 degrees of flap travel for easy short-field landings.

A full airframe emergency ballistic parachute is included as standard equipment.

The  fuel tank allows an endurance of more than 4 hours.

Its initial price of US$85,000 was intended to address moves by Pipistrel's competition in raising prices on their aircraft. In particular, the Alpha's price was initially set well below the then-current US$149,000 price announced for the comparable Cessna 162. As of April 2020, the base price ranged between €65,000 (US$70,100) and €86,800 (US$93,600), depending on the country-specific regulatory requirements.

Variants

Alpha Electro

Pipistrel introduced an electric version called the Alpha Electro in 2015 at a price of 69,000 euros, with technology from the Pipistrel WATTsUP proof of concept design, for short training. It has energy for one flight hour plus reserves, and can recharge in 45 minutes or have its batteries replaced in 5 minutes. Instead of 78 lb (35.5 kg) of fuel, it has 277 pounds (126 kg) of LiPo cells, however the water cooled electric motor weighs 11 kg; much less than the gasoline engine. It has a useful load of 380 lb, whereas a Cessna 152 has between 350 and 480 lb useful load.

After 38 minutes of flying various manoeuvres, battery charge may be 25%. From the inside, the Electro is very similar to the gasoline-powered version, but from the outside, the Electro is much quieter. Electricity costs are about 1/10 of gasoline.

The Electro is now certified in the USA. In 2015 Pipistrel intended to fly the Electro from France to England two days before the Airbus E-Fan, but was prevented by Siemens.  Four Electro aircraft will be used to provide flight training in Fresno, California starting in late 2017 as part of the Sustainable Aviation Project.

Operators
 WorldWide Wings – 15 on order for use in the school's locations in California and Florida, United States.

Specifications (Alpha Trainer)

See also

References

External links

2010s Slovenian civil utility aircraft
Single-engined tractor aircraft
Light-sport aircraft
High-wing aircraft